Alice Fernanda Soto Gallegos (born 26 March 2006) is a Mexican footballer who plays for C.F. Pachuca in Liga MX Femenil.

Career

In 2018, at the age of twelve years and two months, Soto became the youngest professional female footballer to be registered with the Mexican Football Federation.

In February 2020, Soto made her Liga MX Femenil debut for Pachuca aged thirteen, as a 65th-minute substitute in a 5–0 home win versus Querétaro. On 28 March 2021, aged fourteen, Soto became the youngest Mexican footballer to score at a professional level in a 0–1 win over Puebla.

References

External links 
 
 

2006 births
Living people
Mexican women's footballers
Footballers from Guanajuato
People from Salamanca, Guanajuato
Women's association football forwards
C.F. Pachuca (women) footballers
Liga MX Femenil players
Mexico women's youth international footballers
Mexican footballers